Asianet Comedy Awards is an award ceremony for Malayalam television and films presented by Asianet, a Malayalam-language television network from the south-Indian state of Kerala. The awards are given for the actors who made excellence in the comical roles. The awards are normally presented annually and held in Adlux International Convention Center Angamaly.
Meera and Jewel Mary hosted the show in 2015 & 2016.Pearle Maaney and Meera hosted the show in 2017.

Award's list 2017

 Best Movie - Varnyathil Aashanka
 Best Director -Raffi
Best Actor-Jayaram (Achayans)
 Best Actress - Aparna Balamurali (Sunday Holiday)
 Popular Actor - Biju Menon (Rakshadhikari Baiju Oppu)
 Popular Actress - Miya
 Popular movie -
 Best Song - Thechille Penne (Role Models)
 Best Script - 
 Versatile Actor - Kunchako Boban (Varnyathil Aashanka, Ramante Edenthottam)
 Evergreen Golden Star - Sreenivasan
 Comedy Icon - Salim Kumar
Youth Icon -Tovino Thomas (Godha, Oru Mexican Aparatha)
Star performer of the year - Renji Panicker (Godha)
Best Combo -Aju Varghese, Neeraj Madhav (Lava Kusha)
 Supporting Actor - Lal (Chunkzz)
 Most Promising Actor - Sshivada (Achayans), Aditi Ravi (Alamara), Aishwarya Lekshmi (Njandukalude Naatil Oridavela)
 All Rounder of the Year - Soubin Shahir
 Entertainer of the year - 
 Child Artist - 
Entertainer of the Year - Asif Ali
 All-time favorite of Media (TV) - Suraj Venjaramoodu
 Best Actor (TV) - Payyans Jayakumar
 Best Actress (TV) - Archana Suseelan
 Best Anchor - 
 Versatile Performer – TV - Arya Rohit and Akhil
 Top TV Performer - Suraj Venjaramoodu

Award's list 2016
 Best Movie - Two Countries
 Best Director - Abrid Shine
 Best Actor - Dileep
 Best Actress - Mamta Mohandas
 Popular Actor - Jayasurya
 Popular Movie - Pretham
 Best Song - Suresh Thampanoor
 Best Script - Syam Pushkaran
 Versatile Actor - Siddique
 Evergreen Favorite Star - Mukesh
 Comedy Icon - Aju Varghese
 Supporting Actor - Pradeep Kottayam
 Most Promising Actor - Saju Navodaya
 All Rounder of the Year - Vineeth Sreenivasan
 Entertainer of the year - Kalabhavan Shajon
 Child Artist - Akshara Kishore
 Multifaceted Talent - Suraj Venjaramoodu
 Best Actor (TV) - Anoop Chandran
 Best Actress (TV) - Beena Antony
 Best Anchor - Kishore
 Versatile Performer – TV - Dharmajan Bolgatty
 Top TV Performer - Rimi Tomy
 Special Jury Award - Saji Venkulam

Awards list 2015
Life Time Glory Award : Janardhanan
Life Time Achievement Award : Jagathy Sreekumar
Best Actor  : Jayaram
Best Actress : Anusree
Youth Icon: Aju Varghese
Popular Movie : Jamna Pyari
Multifaceted Talent : Mukesh for Badai bungalow
Versatile Comedian : Jagadeesh
Comedy Movie : Chandrettan Evideya
Best Director : Siddique
Comedy Pair : Vinay Forrt & Soubin Shahir
Best Writer Comical Scene : Shabareesh Varma, Rajesh Murugesan for Premam
Best Comedy Skit : Santhosh 
Best actor (TV)- Kottayam Rasheed for Sthreedhanam
Best actress (TV) -Kanya Bharathi for Chandanamazha
Newface (TV & Film ):Nobi
Comedy Dialogue : Sharaf U Dheen
Best Presenter : Ramesh Pisharody for badai bungalow

See also 

 List of Asian television awards

References

External links

 https://www.keralatv.in/2016/10/asianet-comedy-awards-2016/

Indian film awards
Indian television awards